Jessie Ralph Patton ( Chambers; November 5, 1864 – May 30, 1944), known as Jessie Ralph, was an American stage and screen actress, best known for her matronly roles in many classic films.

Early life 
Jessie Ralph Chambers was the 13th child born to sailing captain James Chambers and his wife. Born in Gloucester, Massachusetts in 1864, she made her acting debut in stock theater in 1880, at age 16.

Career 
Her Broadway debut came in The Kreutzer Sonata (1906), and her final appearance on Broadway came in The Good Earth (1932).

Ralph debuted in two-reel films in New York in 1915 and went to Hollywood in 1933. in a movie career that spanned 25 years, she became a permanent Hollywood actress in 1933. She was nearly 70 then, so her parts were limited to matronly roles, but her expertise at stealing scenes captured the imagination of cinema-goers of the time.

Her best-known roles are as Greta Garbo's maid in Camille, as W.C. Fields' battle-axe of a mother-in-law in The Bank Dick, as Myrna Loy's Aunt Katherine (in a state of permanent high dudgeon) in After the Thin Man, and as Peggotty in David Copperfield. She starred in 55 movies, 52 from 1933 to 1941.

Personal life 
She was married to actor William Patton until his death. They had no children.

Death
Ralph retired from Hollywood in 1941 after her leg was amputated. She died in Gloucester, Massachusetts, on May 30, 1944, aged 79. Her gravesite is there, in Mount Pleasant Cemetery.

Filmography

References

External links

 
 
 Jessie Ralph portrait at NY Public Library Billy Rose Collection

1864 births
1944 deaths
19th-century American actresses
20th-century American actresses
Actresses from Massachusetts
American film actresses
American stage actresses
People from Gloucester, Massachusetts